The Plyussa is a river in Plyussky and Gdovsky Districts of Pskov Oblast and in Slantsevsky District of Leningrad Oblast in Russia. It is a right tributary of the Narva. The urban-type settlement of Plyussa and the town of Slantsy are located on the banks of the Plyussa.

The source of the Plyussa is in Lake Zapluysskoye in the eastern part of Plyussky District. The river flows south and turns northwest. In Gdovsky District, it gradually turns north and enters Leningrad Oblast. Below the town of Slantsy, the natural course of the Plyussa is made a water reservoir, a bay of the Narva Reservoir. The mouth of the Plyussa is in the southern bay of the Narva Reservoir.

The river gave its name to the Treaty of Plussa, concluded at its banks. The treaty ended the Livonian War between Sweden and Russia in 1583.

Until the 1990s, the river was used for timber rafting.

References

External links

 

Rivers of Leningrad Oblast
Rivers of Pskov Oblast